Grzegorz Stępniak (born 24 March 1989) is a Polish professional racing cyclist, who most recently rode for UCI Continental team .

Career
In 2015 he finished 1st overall in the Dookoła Mazowsza. Stępniak announced in December 2019 that he would retire from the sport at the end of the season. However, he was named as part of the  team for the 2020 season.

Major results

2012
 Bałtyk–Karkonosze Tour
1st Stages 2 & 3
 1st Stage 2 Dookoła Mazowsza
2013
 Bałtyk–Karkonosze Tour
1st Stages 1, 2, 4 & 5
 Dookoła Mazowsza
1st Stages 1 & 5
 2nd Memoriał Andrzeja Trochanowskiego
2014
 1st Stage 3 Course de la Solidarité Olympique
 2nd Puchar Ministra Obrony Narodowej
2015
 1st  Overall Dookoła Mazowsza
 1st Stage 2 Bałtyk–Karkonosze Tour
 2nd Puchar Ministra Obrony Narodowej
 3rd Velothon Stockholm
 9th Overall Podlasie Tour
2016
 1st  Overall Tour of Estonia
1st  Points classification
1st Stage 1
2017
 1st Stage 1 Course de la Solidarité Olympique
 1st Stage 4 Szlakiem Walk Majora Hubala
 2nd Overall Dookoła Mazowsza
 2nd Horizon Park Race Maidan
 2nd Memoriał Andrzeja Trochanowskiego
 4th Memoriał Romana Siemińskiego
2018
 1st  Overall Tour of Estonia
 3rd Overall Dookoła Mazowsza
 5th Road race, National Road Championships
 5th Memoriał Romana Siemińskiego
 10th Minsk Cup
2019
 2nd Overall Szlakiem Walk Majora Hubala
1st Stage 1
 2nd Overall Dookoła Mazowsza
 5th Road race, National Road Championships

References

External links

1989 births
Living people
Polish male cyclists
People from Goleniów
Sportspeople from West Pomeranian Voivodeship